The 1971 Oklahoma State Cowboys football team represented Oklahoma State University in the Big Eight Conference during the 1971 NCAA University Division football season. In their third and final season under head coach Floyd Gass, the Cowboys compiled a 4–6–1 record (2–5 against conference opponents), tied for fifth place in the conference, and were outscored by opponents by a combined total of 322 to 184.

The team's statistical leaders included Bobby Cole with 631 rushing yards, Tony Pounds with 792 passing yards, and Dick Graham with 631 receiving yards.

The team played its home games at Lewis Field in Stillwater, Oklahoma. It was the last year the Cowboys played their home games on natural grass; AstroTurf was installed as part of a massive stadium renovation during the offseason, and the facility, now known as Boone-Pickens Stadium, has sported artificial turf since.

Schedule

After the season

The 1972 NFL Draft was held on February 1–2, 1972. The following Cowboy was selected.

References

Oklahoma State
Oklahoma State Cowboys football seasons
Oklahoma State Cowboys football